Follo District Court is a district court located in the town of Ski, Norway, and covering the district of Follo in Akershus County. The court was established on 1 January 2006, with the merger of Indre Follo District Court and Ytre Follo District Court. 

The court covers the municipalities of Enebakk, Frogn, Nesodden, Oppegård, Ski, Vestby and Ås and is subordinate Borgarting Court of Appeal.

References

Defunct district courts of Norway
Organisations based in Akershus
Ski, Norway
2006 establishments in Norway
Courts and tribunals established in 2006